Basnayaka Yasarathnalage Gunapala Rathnasekara (born 7 December 1961) is a Sri Lankan academic, politician and Member of Parliament.

Rathnasekara was born on 7 December 1961. He has a BSc degree from the University of Sri Jayewardenepura and a MCom degree from the Sri Krishnadevaraya University. He is a senior lecturer in the University of Sri Jayewardenepura's Department of Accounting. He is director of the Kurunegala Sipwin Private Tuition Institute. He is a member of Viyathmaga (Path of the Learned), a pro-Rajapaksa, nationalist group of academics, businesspeople and professionals.

Rathnasekara contested the 2020 parliamentary election as a Sri Lanka People's Freedom Alliance electoral alliance candidate in Kurunegala District and was elected to the Parliament of Sri Lanka.

References

1961 births
Academic staff of the University of Sri Jayewardenepura
Alumni of the University of Sri Jayewardenepura
Living people
Members of the 16th Parliament of Sri Lanka
Sinhalese academics
Sinhalese politicians
Sri Lankan Buddhists
Sri Lanka People's Freedom Alliance politicians
Sri Lanka Podujana Peramuna politicians